Ryan Gallant (born May 25, 1982) is an American professional skateboarder with a goofy-footed stance.

Early life

Gallant was born in Waltham, Massachusetts, United States (U.S.) Ryan began skateboarding as a youth in waltham, where the skateboarding scene was abundant and robust with such skateboarders as Matt Schnorr ( Null Skateboards, Es' shoes, Eastern Boarder and Next gen skateshop), Chi Chi Rodriguez, And Matthew Place (Place Matt) (Next Gen Skateshop, Concepts Skateshop, MNC flowteam) as well as many others from the local "skate scene" although he was later raised in Southborough, Massachusetts.

Professional skateboarding
Gallant was first noticed in the skate video PJ Ladd's Wonderful Horrible Life, a shop video from Boston, Massachusetts's Coliseum skate shop. He is also affiliated with True East Skateshop, which is an East Coast-based chain of "mom and pop" shops.

Gallant was first sponsored by Expedition One skateboards and appeared in the company's first video Alone. In April 2009, Gallant left his longtime sponsor DC Shoes and established a sponsorship deal with Circa.

Gallant is featured in the 2007 video game EA Skate as a playable character. He is also featured in the EA Skate sequels Skate 2 and Skate 3.

The "Gallant Grind" is a skateboard trick that is named after Gallant.

Sponsors
As of December 2015, Gallant is sponsored by Expedition One, Bones Swiss Bearings, Gold Wheels, MOB Grip, Silver Trucks,.

Videography
Digital: Who Let the Dogs out (2001)
Monkey Business: Project of a lifetime (2002)
Gold Wheels: Got Gold? (2002)
Expedition-One "Alone" (2002)
PJ Ladd's Wonderful Horrible Life (2002)
DC: The DC Video (2003)
Digital "Everyday" (2003)
The Kayo Corp: Promo (2004) 
Transworld Skateboarding: First Love (2005) 
Plan B: Live After Death (2006)
Plan B: "Superfuture" (2008)
C1rca: "Welcome" (2011)
Expedition: "Madness" (2011)
Expedition: "All Ages" (2013)
Da Playground: "Honor Roll" (2013)

Video game appearances
Gallant is a playable character in the Electronic Arts video games: Skate, Skate 2 and Skate 3.

References

External links
Expedition-One Skateboard All Ages Video
Da Playground Honor Roll
Transworld First Love
Pj Ladd's wonderful horrible Life
EA Skate Profile

1982 births
Living people
American skateboarders
Sportspeople from Waltham, Massachusetts
Sportspeople from Carlsbad, California